Gangaji (born Texas, 1942) is an American born spiritual teacher and author. She lives in Ashland, Oregon, with her husband, fellow spiritual teacher Eli Jaxon-Bear.

Early life
Gangaji was born Merle Antoinette Roberson (Toni) in Texas on June 11, 1942, and grew up in Mississippi. After graduating from the University of Mississippi she and her young family moved to San Francisco. After a divorce she sought to change her life via political activism and spiritual practice. She took Buddhist Bodhisattva vows, practiced Zen and Vipassana meditation, helped in a Tibetan-Buddhist-style meditation center, and began a career as an acupuncturist in the San Francisco Bay area.
Unfulfilled by her seemingly successful life, in 1989 she and Eli Jaxon-Bear moved to Hawaii.

Papaji
At this time she met Andrew Cohen, a spiritual teacher and student of Sri H.W.L. Poonja, also known as Papaji. Impressed by Cohen’s "enormous confidence", she returned to California to sit with him for two months. In the meantime, Eli, who had become her second husband, met Papaji in India. Struck by the letters she received from Eli, Gangaji herself traveled to Lucknow, India to meet Papaji in 1990. In her autobiography Just Like You she wrote, "The extraordinary event in this life was that I met Papaji. Until then I looked everywhere for the transcendental or the extraordinary, but after meeting Papaji I began to find the extraordinary in every moment." Papaji gave her the name Gangaji, and asked her to share what she had directly realized with others.

Teaching

Gangaji currently writes and tours as a teacher. She holds that the truth of who you are is already free and at peace, which can be realized simply by ending one’s search.

"I invite people to just stop and be still. And in that you discover who you are, because once you discover who you are, you can stop fragmenting into pieces. I know that in any one day there are moments where there is nothing going on, but we link up what is happening from thought to thought without any space. We overlook the spaciousness that it is all happening in."

Gangaji uses a personal form of inquiry to aid in the realization of 'direct experience':
"I use inquiry as a way of getting the mind to turn inward to the silence. It could be the question, "Who am I?" Or it could be "What am I avoiding in this moment?" Or, "Where is silence?" "What is needed in this moment, right in this very moment, what is needed for true peace?" "What is needed if this was my last moment on earth?" Rather than sending the mind outward to gather information or experiences, it is really sending the mind inward to question our basic assumption of who we think we are."

In facing strong emotions such as fear and anger, or in dealing with traumas which keep people locked in personal misery and unable to experience freedom, Gangaji teaches "direct experience," or meeting whatever emotion is present. For example, she says, "Fear is about survival. When you drop under that and experience the fear without trying to change it, just letting it be, then it becomes still. When you open your heart to fear, rather than trying to fight it or deny it or even overcome it, then you find it is just energy."

Gangaji Foundation
Since 1993 Gangaji’s work has been supported by The Gangaji Foundation, a non-profit headquartered in Ashland, Oregon. Its mission statement states: "The Gangaji Foundation serves the truth of universal consciousness, and the potential for the individual and collective recognition of peace inherent in the core of all being. It is the purpose of the Gangaji Foundation to forthrightly and respectfully present the teaching and transmission of Gangaji.

The Gangaji Foundation produces events, publishes books and videos, hosts a website and runs several outreach programs including a prison program.

Personal life
In October 2005, Gangaji's husband, Eli Jaxon-Bear, admitted to Gangaji that he had had a three-year affair with an adult female student and executive director of his organization, the Leela Foundation. After a brief separation, Gangaji and her husband reconciled their marriage in December 2005. At the student’s request, the information about the affair was not made public at that time. In January 2006, Gangaji and her husband merged their foundations, continuing to teach together and separately.

In October 2006, Jaxon-Bear disclosed his extramarital relationship to the Gangaji Foundation's board of directors and staff. For a time Jaxon-Bear stopped teaching. Both he and the Gangaji Foundation held open meetings with the stated purpose to heal whatever wounds may have been experienced in their spiritual community. In addition Gangaji, and eventually she and her husband, held retreats on the subjects of disillusionment, betrayal, and relationship.

In 2007 Jaxon-Bear was diagnosed with multiple myeloma, a severe form of blood cancer. After undergoing extensive treatment he made a partial recovery. In January 2008, he reestablished the Leela Foundation and resumed teaching on his own and with Gangaji.

Bibliography

Books
 You are That! (1995), 
 Freedom and Resolve (1999), 
 Just Like You, An Autobiography (2003), 
 The Diamond in Your Pocket: Discovering Your True Radiance (2007), 
 Hidden Treasure: Uncovering the Truth in Your Life Story (2011), 
 Freedom and Resolve, Finding Your True Home in the Universe (2014)

Articles and chapters
 Ed Shapiro, Deb Shapiro. "Be the Change: How Meditation Can Transform You and the World", Sterling Ethos (2009), 
 Brent Kessel. "It's Not About the Money: Unlock Your Money Type to Achieve Spiritual and Financial Abundance", HarperOne (2008) , pp. 39, 77, 155.
 Rita Robinson. "Ordinary Women, Extraordinary Wisdom: The Feminine Face of Awakening", O Books (2007), Language: English, pp. 209–231.
 Science of Mind (July 2005), Media Review of The Diamond in Your Pocket
 LA Yoga (March 2005), "Sitting Down with Gangaji"
 Mail Tribune (Medford/Ashland, OR, Dec. 31, 2004), "New Age Haven Attracts Gangaji"
 Sacred Pathways (June/July 2004), "Uncovering Self-Betrayal on the Way to Serve Love and World Peace"
 Pathways (Washington, DC, Spring 2004), "The Awakening Power of Two Simple Questions"
 New ConneXion: Journal of Conscious Evolution (Portland, September/October 2003), "Already Immortal"
 Spirituality and Health (Summer 2001), "Satsang with Gangaji"
 The Light Connection (San Diego, January 2001), "The Choice is Yours"
 Albany Advertiser (Albany, NY, March 30, 1999), "Interview with Gangaji"
 Southern Crossings (Australia, March/April 1999), "Satsang with Gangaji"
 Utne Reader (July/August 1998), "God with a Million Faces"
 Nova Magazine (Australia, December 1998), "True Romance: The Relationship with Truth"
 Science of Mind (April 1998), "Your True Self: An Interview with Gangaji"
 Evergreen Monthly (Seattle, June 1997), "The Limitless Nectar of Being"
 The Santa Fe Sun (March 1997), "From Trance to Self: Interview with Gangaji"
 Yoga Journal (May/June 1994), "A Conversation with Gangaji"
 Caduceus (Issue 47), "The Search for Happiness"
 Oasis Magazine

Audio and DVD compilations
 A Love Secret Spoken, CD, 
 Being In Peace, CD, ; DVD, 
 Beyond Practice, CD, ; DVD, 
 Facing Death, CD, ; DVD, 
 Freedom & Desire, CD, ; DVD, 
 Innocence, Trust and Self-Betrayal, CD, ; DVD, 
 Laughing All the Way Home, DVD, 7-81887-0500-3
 Love & Gratitude, CD, ; DVD, 
 Open, Unprotected, and Free, CD, ; DVD, 
 Revealing Strategies of Ego, CD, ; DVD, 
 Spiritual Traps, CD and DVD
 Standing In The Truth Of Who You Are, CD and DVD
 Still In Awareness, CD, ; DVD, 
 The Findhorn Retreat Set, CD and DVD Set
 The Gift of Retreat, CD, 
 The Heart Broken Open, CD, 
 The Invitation, CD, 
 The Jewel in Disillusionment, CD Set,
 The Moment of Choice, CD, ; DVD, 
 The Truth Alive in You, CD Set, 
 The Ungraspable Offering, CD, ; DVD, 
 Unraveling the Knot of Suffering, CD, ; DVD, 
 Untouched By Any Power, CD, ; DVD,

Notes

See also
 Ramana Maharshi
 H. W. L. Poonja (Papaji)

References
 Downing, Jerry N. (2000) Between Conviction and Uncertainty 
 Shapiro, Ed and Deb. (2009) Be the Change: How Meditation Can Transform You and the World, Sterling Ethos,

External links

 Gangaji Foundation

1942 births
Living people
American spiritual teachers
American spiritual writers
New Age spiritual leaders
Writers from Ashland, Oregon
Women mystics
Religious leaders from Oregon
Religion in the Pacific Northwest
Neo-Advaita teachers